Nordstrom Building may refer to:

 Nordstrom Downtown Portland
 Nordstrom Downtown Seattle

See also
 Nordstrom